KordaMentha is an Asia-Pacific advisory and investment firm that provides specialist consulting, forensic, real estate, restructuring and investment services. The business was formed in April 2002 by Mark Korda and Mark Mentha. KordaMentha has offices in Brisbane, Gold Coast, Melbourne, Perth, Sydney and Townsville in Australia while operating international offices in Singapore and Jakarta.

Evolution
KordaMentha partners undertook the first Voluntary Administration in Australia, the largest Voluntary Administration in Australia (Ansett Australia with 42 companies, 15,000 employees and >$1 billion assets), the largest Group of Voluntary Administrations in Australia (Stockford Limited with 84 companies) and more Voluntary Administrations than any other insolvency firm in Australia in 2003.

By 31 March 2003 KordaMentha had expanded its business with licensed offices in Perth, Brisbane and Adelaide. In 2005 KordaMentha grew its Perth and Sydney practice with senior partners and staff joining the firm from Ernst & Young.

KordaMentha now has 400 staff throughout Australia and internationally, with offices in Auckland and Asia as well as international affiliates in the United Kingdom and United States.

In 2013 KordaMentha announced the launch of KordaMentha Investment Management, an investment management platform developed to create value for individuals through strategic Australian real estate assets.

Major engagements
 Ansett Australia: Trade-on Administration of Australia's No. 2 airline with annual turnover of $3.2 billion. Proceeds from business and asset sales are estimated to total $1 billion.
 Air Australia:
 Cross City Tunnel:

References

Financial services companies of Australia